Wolmyeong Dong Park, Wolmyeongdong Park, or Wolmyeong Park (Hangul: 월명공원; lit. bright moon park) is a popular tourist destination in the city of Gunsan, South Korea. It is an intersecting point where five mountains connect. It is open year-round.

Things to see 
From the top of Susi Tower one can see all of Gunsan City, the sea to the south of Gunsan, the mouth of the Geum River, and the giant Janghang smelting factory.

At the foot of Seollim Mountain is an old temple, Eunjeoksa. Between Seollim Mountain and Jeombang Mountain is the Jeil Reservoir.

The park also contains an observatory, a sculpture garden, and various monuments.

The gardens have been well kept, and 31-year old rattan and cherry trees can be seen.

April cherry blossom photo contest 

The park during April is covered in cherry blossoms. During that time in April, a cherry blossom photo contest is held at the park.

Tourist attractions in North Jeolla Province
Parks in North Jeolla Province